Kochukadavanthra (Cheriakadavanthra) is a small area of Elamkulam village in Ernakulam district of Kerala, south India. The nearest big city is Ernakulam. Kochukadavanthra situated in the west bank of the Perandoor Kanal south end. Residential area of Kasthurba Nagar and south Panampilly Nagar belongs to Kochukadavanthra. You can reach at Kochukadavanthra by traveling two kilometer south side from Panampally Nagar Junction through Panampally Nagar avenue Road.

Educational institutions nearby
Traum Academy for German & French languages

Facilities
Major centres in and around Kochu-kadavanthra include:
 SMS HABITAT Apartments by SMS Builders
 SMS SERINITY Apartments by SMS Builders
 SMS INFINITY Apartments by SMS Builders
 URVI Concepts - Architects & Interior Designers

References 

Villages in Ernakulam district